De Mi Alma Latina (also known as From My Latin Soul) is a 1994 Latin music album by Spanish tenor Plácido Domingo. It was nominated for a Grammy Award for Best Latin Pop Album of the year. Most of the tracks on the album are medleys of, in the words of one author, "some of the Latino world's most memorable melodies." The only new composition on the album, "De México a Buenos Aires", was written by Domingo's son Plácido Domingo Jr. All the songs are in Spanish, except for "Manhã de Carnaval" and "Aquarela do Brasil", which are in Portuguese. Domingo also used "De Mi Alma Latina" and "From My Latin Soul" as the names for some of his subsequent Latin music concerts. In 1997, he released a follow-up album entitled De Mi Alma Latina 2.

Background

Both Angel Records and EMI Latin worked together on the album. The president of EMI Latin explained that both labels were trying to "reach every possible Placido fan out there, be it Latino or opera." In addition to the audio recording, Domingo starred in a music video of one of the songs on the album, the Peruvian classic "La Flor de la Canela", with Colombian actress Amparo Grisales.

Reception

The reviewer for The Washington Post praised the album as in some ways "the most satisfying record Domingo has made." After stating that numerous good recordings of operas exist, he elaborated: "But you don't find much when you start looking (as I have) for a recording of 'Aquellos ojos verdes' or 'Solamente una vez' sung with a voice of Domingo's caliber and an instinct for the proper style." He also called Domingo "versatile as any musician in living memory" in part for the variety of recordings he had out at the time, including De Mi Alma Latina, the opera Parsifal, the classical symphonic album, Placido Domingo Sings and Conducts Tchaikovsky, and re-issues of Placido Domingo: Opera Classics and Verdi and Puccini Duets (with Leontyne Price). Domingo's multi-platinum live recording as part of the Three Tenors, The Three Tenors in Concert 1994, also came out two weeks before De Mi Alma Latina.

In January 1995, the recording's Grammy nomination for Best Latin Pop Album was the first ever received by the classical music label, Angel Records. At the time of the album's nomination, Billboard Magazine called De Mi Alma Latina underrated and predicted that Domingo might beat frontrunner and eventual winner Luis Miguel for his Segundo Romance.

Track listing

Chart positions

Sales and certifications

Personnel

Plácido Domingo, vocals
Bebu Silvetti, conductor, arranger, piano, synthesizer
VVC Symphonic Orchestra
WC Symphony
Ana Gabriel, guest vocals
Daniela Romo, guest vocals
Patricia Sosa, guest vocals
Pandora, guest vocals
Francis Benítez, backup vocals
Bibi Cross-Nicolosi, backup vocals
Pierre Garreaud, backup vocals
Daniel Indart, backup vocals
Yari Moré, backup vocals
Carlos Murguía, backup vocals
Ana Robles, backup vocals
Sara Traina, backup vocals
Giselda Vatchky, backup vocals

References

1994 albums
Plácido Domingo albums
Albums produced by Bebu Silvetti
Albums arranged by Bebu Silvetti